Six ships of the Royal Navy have borne the name HMS Minotaur after the minotaur, a creature in Greek mythology:

  was a 74-gun third-rate ship of the line launched in 1793. She fought at the battles of the Nile and Trafalgar and was wrecked in 1810 off Texel.
  was a 74-gun third rate launched in 1816, renamed Hermes in 1866 and broken up in 1869.
She was renamed Boscawen II in 1904, Ganges in 1906 and Ganges II in 1908, and broken up in 1922.
 HMS Minotaur was to have been a  cruiser.
She was transferred to the Royal Canadian Navy in 1944 and renamed . She was decommissioned in 1958 and broken up in 1960.

References

Royal Navy ship names